Events in the year 2001 in Moldova.

Incumbents
 President – Vladimir Voronin
 Prime Minister – Dumitru Braghiș, Vasile Tarlev
 President of the Parliament – Dumitru Diacov, Eugenia Ostapciuc

Events

February
 25 February - Parliamentary elections take place.

April
 4 April - Presidential elections take place.
 19 April - The First Tarlev Cabinet is formed.

June
 6–7 June - The GUAM charter is signed.

July
 26 July – Moldova joins the World Trade Organization.

August
 27 August - Moldova celebrated the 10th anniversary of independence.

References

 
2000s in Moldova
Moldova
Moldova
Years of the 21st century in Moldova